The Historic Preservation Commission of the Town of Amherst, New York is a governmental organization empowered to designate historic landmarks and districts within the town's boundaries. As of August 2021, there are 32 such landmarks in the town, all of which are individual properties as opposed to districts.

Historic Preservation Commission 

The Historic Preservation Commission was established in 1994 under the auspices of Amherst's Historic Preservation Law, in accordance with Section 96-a of the General Municipal Law of the State of New York concerning protection of historic places, buildings and works of art. This provision of law gives the town government the authority to "provide, by local law, regulations, special conditions and restrictions for the protection, enhancement, perpetuation and the use of places, districts, sites, buildings, structures, works of art and other objects having special character or special historical or other aesthetic interest or value".

Designation of historic properties

The Commission's power to recommend designation of historic landmarks or districts is based on a range of different criteria including importance in local history, architectural distinction, and whether, "because of a unique location or singular physical characteristic, [they represent]... established and familiar visual feature[s] of the neighborhood." The recommendation is then sent forward to the Town Board, who, after receiving feedback from various town departments and from citizens themselves at a public hearing, either reject the recommendation or adopt it into law as deemed appropriate. Upon designation as a historic property or district, the assent of the Historic Preservation Commission is required for any future "exterior alteration, restoration, reconstruction, excavation, grading, demolition, new construction [or] material change... which affect [its] appearance or cohesiveness."

Village of Williamsville

To date, the Amherst Town Board has only applied historic designation to properties within the unincorporated portion of the town. The incorporated Village of Williamsville has its own Historic Preservation Commission, an organ of the village government wholly separate from its town-based counterpart, that handles landmark designation within its boundaries.

List of Designated Historic Properties

See also

National Register of Historic Places in Erie County, New York
List of local landmarks in Williamsville, New York

External links

Town of Amherst Historic Preservation Commission

References 

Buildings and structures in Erie County, New York
Amherst